Dr. Charles and Susan Skinner House and Outbuildings, also known as Linden Hall, is a historic plantation house located in Warren County, North Carolina near the town of Littleton. It was built between 1840 and 1844, and is a two-story, three-bay, single-pile, T-shaped Greek Revival style frame dwelling with a hipped roof. It has two hemioctagonal wings and three porches. Also on the property are the contributing kitchen (1840-1844), dairy (1840-1844), smokehouse (1840-1844), neceaary (1840-1844), and two dependencies (1840-1844).

It was listed on the National Register of Historic Places in 2000.

See also
Little Manor, another plantation house near the town of Littleton

References

Plantation houses in North Carolina
Houses on the National Register of Historic Places in North Carolina
Greek Revival houses in North Carolina
Houses completed in 1844
Houses in Warren County, North Carolina
National Register of Historic Places in Warren County, North Carolina